Helen Mountfield,  (born 14 March 1967) is a British barrister practising in administrative, human rights, and equality law. She has been Principal of Mansfield College, Oxford since 2018.

Early life and education
Mountfield was born on 14 March 1967 in London, England to Sir Robin Mountfield and Anne Mountfield. She was educated at Crown Woods School, a comprehensive school in London. She studied modern history at Magdalen College, Oxford, graduating with a first class Bachelor of Arts (BA) degree. She then moved into law, and studied for a diploma in law (DipLaw) and the Common Professional Examination at City University. She later studied for a diploma in European Union Law (Dip Eur. Law) at King's College, London.

Career

Legal career
Mountfield was called to the Bar at Gray's Inn in 1991. She was a founding member of Matrix Chambers in 2000 from which she still practises. She has been a recorder since May 2009, and a Deputy High Court Judge since 2013. She was appointed Queen's Counsel (QC) on 22 March 2010. She has also been a judge of the Courts of Appeal, Jersey and Guernsey since 2020. She was sworn in as Judge of the Jersey Court of Appeal in April 2020.

Notable cases she has been involved in include: R (E) v Governing Body of JFS; R (Tigere) v Secretary of State for Business, Innovation and Skills; and R (Miller) v Secretary of State for Exiting the European Union.

Academic career
In January 2018, she was announced as the next Principal of Mansfield College, Oxford: she took up the appointment in September 2018.

She has co-authored seven editions of Blackstone's Guide to the Human Rights Act 1998; a monograph concerning the Human Rights Act 1998.

Personal life
In 2005, Mountfield married Damian Tambini. They have three daughters.

Selected works

References

External links
 
 

Principals of Mansfield College, Oxford
1967 births
Living people
British barristers
British women lawyers
21st-century King's Counsel
British legal scholars
Place of birth missing (living people)
Alumni of Magdalen College, Oxford
English King's Counsel
Women legal scholars